Quraysh ("Chapter Quraysh") is the 106th chapter (surah) of the Qur'an consisting of 4 ayat or verses. The surah takes its name from the word "Quraysh" in the first verse.

Summary
1-4 The Quraish exhorted to thank God for commercial privileges.

Text and meaning

Text and transliteration

Hafs from Aasim ibn Abi al-Najud

¹ 

² 

³ 

⁴ 

Warsh from Nafiʽ al-Madani

¹ 

² 

³ 

 

⁵

Meanings

(It is a great Grace and Protection from Allah), for the taming of the Quraish,

(And with all those Allah's Grace and Protections for their taming, We cause) the (Quraish) caravans to set forth safe in winter (to the south), and in summer (to the north without any fear),

So let them worship (Allah) the Lord of this House (the Ka'bah in Makkah).

(He) Who has fed them against hunger, and has made them safe from fear.

For the accustomed security of the Quraysh –

Their accustomed security [in] the caravan of winter and summer –

Let them worship the Lord of this House,

Who has fed them, [saving them] from hunger and made them safe, [saving them] from fear.

For the covenants (of security and safeguard enjoyed) by the Quraish,

Their covenants (covering) journeys by winter and summer,-

Let them adore the Lord of this House,

Who provides them with food against hunger, and with security against fear (of danger).

For the taming of Qureysh

For their taming (We cause) the caravans to set forth in winter and summer.

So let them worship the Lord of this House,

So let them worship the Lord of this House,

Asbāb al-nuzūl
Asbāb al-nuzūl (أسباب النزول), meaning occasions or circumstances of revelation, refers to the historical context in which Quranic ayaat were revealed. Regarding the timing and contextual background of the revelation (asbāb al-nuzūl), it is an earlier "Meccan surah", which means it is believed to have been revealed in Mecca, rather than later in Medina. Alī ibn Ahmad al-Wāhidī (d. 468/1075), is the earliest scholar of the branch of the Qur'anic sciences known as Asbāb al-Nuzūl. He records that

Summary
This surah urges the Quraysh tribe who dominated Mecca to serve God, who had protected them, for the sake of their own future. It is one of two suras containing 4 ayat; the other is Al-Ikhlas. It forms a pair with the preceding sura, al-Fil, reminding the Quraysh of the favors that Allah had bestowed upon them.

The Kaaba was central to the life of the Quraysh, being a center of pilgrimage which brought much trade and prestige. Sura al-Fil describes how God saved the Kaaba from destruction, while Sura Quraysh describes God as Lord of the Kaaba. It also urges the Quraysh to worship God so that, among other things, he would protect them on their trading journeys.

References

External links
Quran 106 Clear Quran translation

Quraysh
Quraysh